Shoo Shoo Baby may refer to:

Shoo Shoo Baby (song), a song made popular by The Andrews Sisters
Shoo Shoo Baby (aircraft), a restored World War II USAAF B-17G Flying Fortress bomber